The Lola T91/00 is a highly successful open-wheel racing car chassis, designed and built by Lola Cars that competed in the CART open-wheel racing series, for competition in the 1991 IndyCar season. It was the most dominant car that season, and extremely competitive, winning a total of 15 out of the 17 races during the 1991 season, with Michael Andretti enjoying the most considerable success, scoring 8 wins, taking 8 pole positions, and leading more laps than any other driver that season. Al Unser Jr. and Arie Luyendyk scored 2 wins, while Bobby Rahal and John Andretti scored one win each. Even though Bobby Rahal won only one race, he had 11 podium finishes, and 13 top 10s, making him a very serious challenger and competitor for the title that year. Michael Andretti eventually went on to win the 1991 IndyCar World Drivers' Championship with this car. It was powered by the  Ilmor-Chevrolet 265-A turbo engine.

References 

Open wheel racing cars
American Championship racing cars
Lola racing cars